A river crossing puzzle is a type of puzzle in which the object is to carry items from one river bank to another, usually in the fewest trips.  The difficulty of the puzzle may arise from restrictions on which or how many items can be transported at the same time, or which or how many items may be safely left together.  The setting may vary cosmetically, for example, by replacing the river by a bridge.  The earliest known river-crossing problems occur in the manuscript Propositiones ad Acuendos Juvenes, traditionally said to be written by Alcuin.   The earliest copies of this manuscript date from the 9th century; it contains three river-crossing problems, including the fox, goose and bag of beans puzzle and the jealous husbands problem.  

Well-known river-crossing puzzles include:

 The fox, goose and bag of beans puzzle, in which a farmer must transport a fox, goose and bag of beans from one side of a river to another using a boat which can only hold one item in addition to the farmer, subject to the constraints that the fox cannot be left alone with the goose, and the goose cannot be left alone with the beans. Equivalent puzzles have also been stated involving a fox, chicken, and bag of grain, or a wolf, goat, and cabbage, etc.
 The jealous husbands problem, in which three married couples must cross a river using a boat which can hold at most two people, subject to the constraint that no woman can be in the presence of another man unless her husband is also present. This is similar to the missionaries and cannibals problem, in which three missionaries and three cannibals must cross the river, with the constraint that at any time when both missionaries and cannibals are standing on either bank, the cannibals on that bank may not outnumber the missionaries.
 The bridge and torch problem.
 Propositio de viro et muliere ponderantibus plaustrum.  In this problem, also occurring in Propositiones ad Acuendos Juvenes, a man and a woman of equal weight, together with two children, each of half their weight, wish to cross a river using a boat which can only carry the weight of one adult.

These problems may be analyzed using graph-theoretic methods, by dynamic programming, or by integer programming.

See also
 Vertex cover

References

External links
 YouTube video

Logic puzzles